Komarno may refer to:
 Komárno, a town in Slovakia
 Komárno (Kroměříž District), a village in the Czech Republic
 Komarno, Ukraine, a city in Ukraine
 Komarno (Hasidic dynasty)
 Komarno, Manitoba, a community within Rural Municipality of Rockwood, Manitoba, Canada
 Komarno, Lower Silesian Voivodeship, a village in south-west Poland
 Komarno, Lublin Voivodeship, a village in east Poland
 Komarno, a settlement in Crmnica, Montenegro

See also
 Komarna, a village in southern Dalmatia, Croatia
 Komárom, a city in Hungary